Mayfair is a suburb of Johannesburg, South Africa. The suburb is west of the Johannesburg CBD and is adjacent to Fordsburg. It is located in Region F of the City of Johannesburg Metropolitan Municipality.

History
Prior to the discovery of gold on the Witwatersrand in 1886, the suburb lay on land on one of the original farms that make up Johannesburg, called Langlaagte. The land was purchased by J.B. Robinson. It was established as a suburb in 1896 and is named after Mayfair in London.

Demographics
Although designated a white area under apartheid, Indians began moving into Mayfair some time before the end of apartheid.

Today Mayfair has a large Indian population, along with a significant number of Muslim immigrants from the rest of Africa. In recent years Mayfair has become populated with a large number of Somalis and Ethiopians. Mayfair is populated by a diverse community economically and remains a vibrant part of Indian city life.

Notable residents
Former President of South Africa, F. W. de Klerk, the last to hold the office before the end of apartheid in 1994, was born here.

References

Johannesburg Region F